List of poets who wrote in Italian (or Italian dialects).

A 
Antonio Abati
Luigi Alamanni
Aleardo Aleardi
Dante Alighieri
Cecco Angiolieri
Gabriele D'Annunzio
Ludovico Ariosto
Francis of Assisi

B 
Nanni Balestrini
Dario Bellezza
Giuseppe Gioacchino Belli (Roman dialect)
Attilio Bertolucci
Carlo Betocchi
Alberta Bigagli
Giovanni Boccaccio
Maria Alinda Bonacci Brunamonti
Carlo Bordini
Franco Buffoni
Michelangelo Buonarroti
Helle Busacca
Ignazio Buttitta (Sicilian language)
Paolo Buzzi

C 
Dino Campana
Giorgio Caproni
Giosuè Carducci
Guido Cavalcanti
Roberto Carifi
Gabriello Chiabrera
Compagnetto da Prato

D 
Antonio De Santis (Italian and Larinese dialect)
Milo de Angelis
Fabrizio De André
Eugenio De Signoribus

E 
Muzi Epifani

F 
Franco Fortini
Ugo Foscolo

G 
Alfonso Gatto
Giuseppe Giusti
Corrado Govoni
Guido Gozzano
Lionello Grifo
Giovanni Battista Guarini
Amalia Guglielminetti
Margherita Guidacci
Guido Guinizzelli

I 
Gianni Ianuale

L 
Giacomo da Lentini
Jacopo da Leona
Giacomo Leopardi
Mario Luzi
Menotti Lerro
Franco Loi

N 
Giampiero Neri

M 
Lorenzo il Magnifico (sovereign of Florence)
Valerio Magrelli
Alessandro Manzoni
Filippo Tommaso Marinetti
Giambattista Marino
Alda Merini
Metastasio (Pietro Trapassi)
Grazyna Miller
Eugenio Montale (Nobel Prize in literature, 1975)
Vincenzo Monti
Marino Moretti
Maurizio Moro

P 
Elio Pagliarani
Aldo Palazzeschi
Giuseppe Parini
Giovanni Pascoli
Pier Paolo Pasolini
Nicoletta Pasquale
Cesare Pavese
Francesco Petrarca (Petrarch)
Assunta Pieralli
Poliziano (Angelo Ambrogini)
Lorenzo Da Ponte
Antonio Porta (author)
Carlo Porta
Antonia Pozzi
Ezra Pound (Italian, English, and others)
Luigi Pulci (1432–84)

Q 
Salvatore Quasimodo

R 
Giovanni Raboni
Clemente Rebora
Amelia Rosselli
Gabriele Rossetti
Tiziano Rossi

S 
Umberto Saba
Giulio Salvadori
Edoardo Sanguineti
Leonardo Sinisgalli
Maria Luisa Spaziani

T 
Rosa Taddei
Torquato Tasso
Laura Terracina
Giovanni Testori
Jacopone da Todi
Trilussa (Carlo Alberto Salustri) (Roman dialect)
Theodor Daubler

U 
Giuseppe Ungaretti

V 

Diego Valeri (poet)
Emilio Villa

Z 
Andrea Zanzotto

See also
List of Italian writers

References 

Italian poets
 
Poets